Wadi al-Baida, locally known as Wadi al-Jinn, is a valley and an anti-gravity hill in al-Baida Park located approximately 30 kilometers northwest of Medina in the Medina Province of Saudi Arabia. Owing to its optical illusion, vehicles left out of gear in the valley appear to be rolling uphill against the gravity, thus, making the area popular among locals and pilgrims to be purportedly haunted by Jinns, the shape-shifting supernatural creatures featured in both pre-Islamic Arabian folklores and Islamic beliefs. However, the Al Madinah Region Development Authority in 2020 rebutted claims of any spiritual presence in the valley.

References 

Valleys of Saudi Arabia
Gravity hills